Derrick Lewis (born October 30, 1975 in New Orleans, Louisiana) is a former American football wide receiver.

He was signed as an undrafted free agent in 2002 with the New Orleans Saints and spent two years with the Saints before spending two years with the Tampa Bay Buccaneers. He signed with the Houston Texans as a free agent in 2006. The spring before, Lewis started as an offensive specialist for the Arena Football League's Austin Wranglers. While a Wrangler, Lewis broke the record for single-season receptions, in addition to being considered by many a beneficial component for the Wranglers' first ever playoff berth in franchise history. Lewis played his first year of organized football at Sacramento City College in 1998 and caught 34 passes. He transferred to San Diego State.

See also 
 List of NCAA major college football yearly receiving leaders

References

External links 
 arenafootball.com player profile
 AFL stats

1975 births
Living people
Players of American football from New Orleans
American football wide receivers
San Diego State Aztecs football players
New Orleans Saints players
Frankfurt Galaxy players
Tampa Bay Buccaneers players
Austin Wranglers players
Houston Texans players
New Orleans VooDoo players
Orlando Predators players
Sacramento City Panthers football players